Kararua is a village in Siwan district, Bihar, India.

The village has approximately 300 houses. Agriculture is the main livelihood of the inhabitants.

Villages in Siwan district